Maltoni is an Italian surname. Notable people with the surname include:

 Costante Maltoni (1915–1980), Italian diplomat and archbishop
 Rosa Maltoni (1858–1905), Italian mother of Benito Mussolini

Italian-language surnames